St Volodymyr's Cathedral is a cathedral in the centre of Kyiv. It is one of the city's major landmarks and the mother cathedral of the Ukrainian Orthodox Church – Kyiv Patriarchate, one of the churches of Orthodox tradition in Ukraine.

History and description
In 1852, Metropolitan Philaret of Moscow suggested a large cathedral should be built in Kyiv to commemorate the 900th anniversary of the baptism of Kyivan Rus' by prince Volodymyr the Great. People from all over the Russian Empire started donating to this cause, so that by 1859 the cathedral fund had amassed a huge sum of 100,000 rubles. The Kyiv Pechersk Lavra (Monastery of the Caves) produced one million bricks and presented them to the cathedral as well. The design was executed in neo-Byzantine style initially by the architects I. Schtrom, P. Sparro, R. Bemhardt, K. Mayevsky, V. Nikolayev. The final version of the design belongs to Alexander Vikentievich Beretti. It is a traditional six-piered, three-apsed temple crowned by seven cupolas.

The colourful interior of the cathedral is particularly striking. Its mosaics were executed by masters from Venice. The frescoes were created under the guidance of Professor Adrian Prakhov by a group of famous painters: Wilhelm Kotarbiński, Mikhail Nesterov, Mykola Pymonenko, Pavel Svedomsky, Viktor Vasnetsov, Mikhail Vrubel, Viktor Zamyraylo (1868–1939), and others. The painting of the Holy Mother of God by Vasnetsov in the altar apse of the cathedral impresses by its austere beauty.

The entrance door is adorned with relief bronze sculptures of Olha of Kyiv by sculptor Robert Bakh and St. Volodymyr (sculptor H. Zaieman) against a blue background. The iconostasis is carved from the white marble brought from Carrara. The cathedral was completed in 1882, however, the paintings were fully completed only in 1896.

The cathedral risked damage during the Polish–Soviet War in 1920. During the Soviet period, the cathedral narrowly escaped demolition, but not closure. Until the Second World War it served as a museum of religion and atheism. The relics of Saint Barbara, a martyr of the 3rd century AD, were transferred to St Volodymyr's from the St. Michael's Golden-Domed Monastery before it was destroyed by the Bolsheviks, and have remained there since.

After the war the cathedral was reopened and since remained continually open. It was then the main church of the Kyiv Metropolitan See of the Ukrainian Exarchate. The cathedral was one of the few places in the USSR where tourists could openly visit a working Orthodox Church. It saw the revival of Orthodox religion in 1988 when the millennium celebration of the Baptism of Rus' marked a change in Soviet policy on religion.

After the dissolution of the Soviet Union, St Volodymyr's Cathedral ownership became an issue of controversy between two denominations that both claim to represent Ukrainian Orthodox Christianity – the Ukrainian Orthodox Church, a church with an autonomous status that was, at the time, under the Moscow Patriarchate, and the newly established Ukrainian Orthodox Church – Kyiv Patriarchate, which, ultimately, won the control over the cathedral.

Spiritual leaders of the Ukrainian Orthodox Church of Kyiv Patriarchy continue to conduct religious services and prayers in St. Volodymyr's Cathedral. All the ceremonies are conducted in Ukrainian, accompanied during religious holidays by the Cathedral choir, which is often joined by opera singers.

Works by Viktor Vasnetsov in the Cathedral

See also 
History of Christianity in Ukraine
St Volodymyr's Cathedral ownership controversy

References

External links 
 History of Saint Volodymyr Cathedral, Kiev History website 
 Official website
 Sobory.ru — information about the cathedral
ukraine-gateway.org.ua — St. Volodymyr's (Volodymyrsky) Cathedral
  Володимирський собор in Wiki-Encyclopedia Kyiv 
ukraine-today.com — St Volodymyr's Cathedral in Kyiv
Houses of Worship in Kyiv
 Encyclopedia of Ukraine, St Volodymyr's Cathedral, Kyiv
St Volodymyr's Cathedral interior panorama

Cathedrals in Kyiv
Volodymyr's Cathedral
Byzantine Revival architecture in Ukraine
Ukrainian Orthodox Church of the Kyivan Patriarchate cathedrals
19th-century Eastern Orthodox church buildings
Shevchenkivskyi District, Kyiv
Church buildings with domes
Religion and atheism museums in the Soviet Union
Vladimir the Great
Churches of the Orthodox Church of Ukraine